José Pujol (29 September 1922 – 4 June 2013) was a Spanish water polo player. He competed in the men's tournament at the 1948 Summer Olympics.

References

External links
 

1922 births
2013 deaths
Spanish male water polo players
Olympic water polo players of Spain
Water polo players at the 1948 Summer Olympics
Place of birth missing
Water polo players from Barcelona